Nawab Kapur Singh (1697–1753) is considered one of the major figures in Sikh history, under whose leadership the Sikh community traversed one of its darkest periods. He was the organizer of the Sikh Confederacy and the Dal Khalsa. He is regarded by Sikhs as a leader and general par excellence.

Early life

Nawab Kapur Singh was born into the Virk clan of Jatts in 1697. His native village was Kaloke, now in the Sheikhupura district of Punjab. When he seized the village of Faizullapur, near Amritsar, he renamed it Singhpura and made it his headquarters. He is thus, also known as Kapur Singh Faizullapuria, and the small principality he founded, as Faizullapuria or Singhpuria.

Initiation into the Khalsa fold
Kapur Singh underwent amrit-initiation at a large gathering held at Amritsar on Baisakhi Day, 1721 from Panj Piarey led by Bhai Mani Singh.

The title of Nawab
In 1733, the Mughal government decided, at the insistence of Zakarya Khan, to revoke all repressive measures issued against the Sikhs and made an offer of a grant to them. The title of Nawab was conferred upon their leader, with a jagir consisting of the three parganas of Dipalpur, Kanganval and Jhabal.

After a Sarbat Khalsa, the Kapur Singh accepted the offer. Kapur Singh was unanimously elected as the leader and chosen for the title.

Formation of the Dal Khalsa

With the arrival of peace with the Mughals, Sikhs returned to their homes and Kapur Singh undertook the task of consolidating the disintegrated fabric of the Sikh Jathas. These were merged into a single central fighting force (The Dal) divided into two sections: the Budha Dal was the army of the veterans, and the Taruna Dal became the army of the young, led by Hari Singh Dhillon. The former was entrusted with looking after the holy places, preaching the word of the Gurus and inducting converts into the Khalsa Panth by holding baptismal ceremonies. The Taruna Dal was the more active division and its function was to fight in times of emergencies.

Kapur Singh's personality was the common link between these two wings. He was universally respected for his high character. His word was obeyed willingly and to receive baptism at his hands was counted an act of rare merit.

Rise of the Misls
Under Hari Singh's leadership, the Taruna Dal rapidly grew in strength and soon numbered more than 12,000. To ensure efficient control, Nawab Kapur Singh split it into five parts, each with a separate centre. Each part had its own banner and drum, and formed the nucleus of a separate political state. The territories conquered by these groups were entered in their respective papers at the Akal Takht by Jassa Singh Ahluwalia. From these documents or misls, the principalities carved out by them came to known as Misls. Seven more groups were formed subsequently and, towards the close of century, there were altogether twelve Sikh Misls ruling the Punjab.

Death
Nawab Kapur Singh requested the community to relieve him of his office, due to his old age, and at his suggestion, Jassa Singh Ahluwalia was chosen as the supreme commander of the Dal Khalsa. Kapur Singh died on 9 October 1753 at Amritsar and was succeeded by his nephew (Dhan Singh's son), Khushal Singh.

Legacy
The village of Kapurgarh in Nabha is named after Nawab Kapur Singh.

See also
Jassa Singh Ramgarhia

References

1697 births
1753 deaths
Sikh warriors
History of Punjab
People of the Sikh Empire
Punjabi people
Jat rulers
Nihang
Jathedars of Akal Takht
Indian warriors
Indian Sikhs
18th-century Indian monarchs
People from Sheikhupura
People from Amritsar
Military personnel from Amritsar
Politicians from Amritsar